Susanna C. Nied is an American writer and translator.

Life
Her work has appeared in periodicals such as Poetry, APR, Grand Street, Tin House, Two Lines, Poetry East, and Scandinavian Review, and in anthologies such as The Ecco Anthology of International Poetry (Ecco/Harper Collins, 2010), World Beat: International Poetry Now (New Directions, 2006), 100 Great Poems of the 20th Century, (W.W. Norton, 2005), and New Directions 49 (New Directions, 1985).

Awards
 2012 Finalist, PEN Award for Poetry in Translation
 2009 John Frederick Nims Memorial Translation Prize of Poetry Magazine
 2007 Harold Morton Landon Translation Award of the Academy of American Poets
 2005 Finalist, PEN Award for Poetry in Translation
 2005 PEN Translation Fund Grant Award
 1982 PEN/American-Scandinavian Foundation Translation Prize

Works
 
 
 
 
 
 Inger Christensen (2011). Light, Grass, and Letter in April. Translator Susanna Nied. Drawings by Johanne Foss. New Directions Publishing. .

References

External links
 

Living people
Danish–English translators
American women poets
American translators
21st-century American women
1958 births